The Battle of Limanowa-Łapanów took place from 1 December to 13 December 1914, between the Austro-Hungarian Army and the Russian Army near the town of Limanowa ( south-east of Kraków).

The Austro-Hungarian high command had assumed that the German success would weaken Russian forces in the north and that the Galician front would remain quiet. Both these assumptions were incorrect.

Though the Habsburg 2nd army offensive opened on 16 November and met early success, the Russians proved stronger than expected and their 4th Army yielded little ground. Meanwhile, further south the Russian 2nd Army advanced across the San river and moved into the Tarnów area by 20 November. Further north, the Habsburg 4th Army, supported by the 47th German Reserve Division, moved onto the offensive in the last days of November.

In fierce battles around the towns of Łapanów and Limanowa, the Russian 3rd Army was beaten and forced to retreat east, ending its opportunity to reach Kraków. To avoid being surrounded, the Russian 8th Army also had to retreat, stopping its advance toward the Hungarian plains.

The confrontation was one of the final battles won unilaterally by the Austro-Hungarian Army. Most of its later victories during the war were dependent on German assistance, and it ceased to exist with the disestablishment of Austria-Hungary at the end of the war.

Background
As Dimitriev's Russian Third Army advance towards Krakow stalled, Conrad prepared to turn its southern flank.  Accordingly, Roth's Austro-Hungarian Fourth Army's XIV Corps, combined with the German 47 Reserve Infantry Division, was ordered to assemble at Chabówka.  Simultaneously, Boroević's Austro-Hungarian Third Army was to take Bartfeld and Neu Sandez.  By 3 December, Roth was ready to advance towards Limanowa.

Battle
After Roth reached Limanowa on 3 December, he sent his three divisions, the 13th Rifle Division, the 3rd infantry Division, and the 8th infantry Division, north towards Neu-Sandez.  In response, the Russians sent their IX and XI Corps reserves to bolster their threatened southern flank.  In addition, Brusilov's Russian VIII and XXIV Corps were sent to Neu-Sandez.  By 5 December, the Austro-Hungarian advance had halted, and the Russian X and XXI Corps were moving from north of the Vistula to Dimitriev's southern flank.  In response, Conrad sent the Krakow garrison's Austro-Hungarian 45th Rifle Division east of Limanowa, supported by the 39th Honvéd Infantry division, and command elements of the VI Corps.  Dimitriev then ordered his two corps facing Krakow, the Russian IX and XI Corps, to begin a retreat to the east, in an effort to reduce the risk to his southern flank.

On 7 December, the Russian VIII Corps attacked from Neu-Sandez, but Roth's Austro-Hungarians halted their advance in defensive positions prepared earlier. One of the units facing the Russian VIII Corps was Józef Piłsudski's 1st Brigade, Polish Legions. Fighting continued through 10 December, with little movement along a line from Limanowa in the south to Łapanów in the north. With the arrival of the Austro-Hungarian IX Corps from Bartfeld, the Russian XXIV Corps could no longer support the VIII Corps, and the Russian position in Neu-Sandez became untenable. Ivanov then ordered the Russian VIII Corps to retreat towards Zakliczyn, enabling Szurmay's Austro-Hungarians to capture Neu-Sandez on 12 December.

Aftermath
The Russian threat to Krakow was eliminated and the Russians were pushed back across the Carpathians. The Austrian-Hungary forces claimed the battle as a victory.

Roth was awarded the Knight's Cross to the Military Order of Maria Theresa and given the honorific 'von Limanowa-Łapanów'.

Order of battle

Russian forces 
Russian Southwestern Front, Commander-in-chief – Nikolai Ivanov
 3rd Army. Commander Radko Dimitriev
 XI. Corps General Vladimir Sacharow (11. 32. Division)
 IX. Corps General Dmitry Shcherbachev (5., 42. Division)
 X. Corps General Zerpitzki (9., 31. Division) 
 XXI. Corps General Shkinski (33., 44. Division)
 8th Army. Commander Alexei Brusilov
 VIII. Corps General Dragomirow (14., 15. Division)
 XXIV. Corps General Zurikow (48., 49. Division)
 VII. Corps General Eck (13., 34. Division)

Austro-Hungarian Forces 
Commander-in-chief – Conrad von Hötzendorf

 4th Army. Commander – Archduke Joseph Ferdinand
 XI. Corps FML Ljubicic (11.,15., 30. Division)
 XIV. Corps FML. Joseph Roth (3., 8. and 13. Division)
 German 47. Reserve Division (General Alfred Besser)
 VI. Corps FML Arz von Straußenburg (39., 45. Division)
 Cavalry-Corps Herberstein (6., 10., 11. Cavalry-Division)
 3rd Army. Commander – General of Infantry Svetozar Boroevic 
 38. Honved-Division General Sandor Szurmay
 IX. Corps General Rudolf Kralicek (10., 26. Division)
 III. Corps General Emil Colerus von Geldern  (6., 22., 28. Division)
 VII. Corps Archduke Joseph of Austria (17., 20. Division)

References

Sources

Further reading
 Keegan, John. Der Erste Weltkrieg - Eine europäische Tragödie. – Rowohlt Taschenbuchverlag, Hamburg 2001. – .  (In German)
 Rauchensteiner, Manfried. Der Tod des Doppeladlers: Österreich-Ungarn und der Erste Weltkrieg. – Graz, Wien, Köln: Styria, 1993. – . (In German)
 Roth von Limanowa, Josef. Die Schlacht von Limanowa-Lapanów, Dezember 1914. Innsbruck: Druck und Verlag der Kinderfreund-Anstalt, 1928.  (In German)
 Stone, Norman. The Eastern Front 1914-1917. – Hodder and Stoughton, London 1985. – .
 Zenter, Christian. Der Erste Weltkrieg. – Mowegi-Verlag, Rastatt 2000. – . (In German)

Battles of the Eastern Front (World War I)
Battles of World War I involving Austria-Hungary
Battles of World War I involving Russia
Kingdom of Galicia and Lodomeria
1914 in the Russian Empire
December 1914 events